Donaldson Nukunu Sackey (born 30 September 1988) is a Togolese entrepreneur, fashion designer, architect, and former international footballer who played as a striker.

Early and personal life
Born in Lomé, Togo, and raised in Germany, Sackey also holds German citizenship.

Football career
Sackey spent his early career in Germany, Spain and Netherlands, playing for Hertha BSC, Tennis Borussia Berlin, Compostela, FC Oss and Oststeinbeker SV. After playing for English club Forest Green Rovers, he signed for Stockport Sports in August 2012, before moving to Cray Wanderers in April 2013.

He made his international debut for Togo in 2011.

Fashion career
Sackey began as a model for various brands and was voted Top Model of the Year in 2013 by Fashion Odds magazine. Sackey founded the CPxArt fashion brand with his partner Sainey Sidibeh. Their work has included the 'Wu Wear' for the hip hop group Wu Tang Clan.

Education
Sackey finished his Architecture Course at Harvard Graduate School of Design in 2018.

References

1988 births
Living people
German people of Togolese descent
Togolese footballers
German footballers
Togo international footballers
Hertha BSC players
Tennis Borussia Berlin players
SD Compostela footballers
TOP Oss players
Forest Green Rovers F.C. players
Stockport Sports F.C. players
Cray Wanderers F.C. players
Association football forwards
Togolese expatriate footballers
German expatriate footballers
Togolese expatriate sportspeople in Germany
Expatriate footballers in Germany
Togolese expatriate sportspeople in the Netherlands
Expatriate footballers in the Netherlands
Togolese expatriate sportspeople in England
Expatriate footballers in England
German fashion designers
German male models